Laila Steindal (7 December 1932 – 2 August 2021) was a Norwegian politician for the Centre Party.

She served as a deputy representative to the Parliament of Norway from Sogn og Fjordane during the terms 1981–1985 and 1985–1989. In total she met during 172 days of parliamentary session. She was deputy mayor of Flora and a member of Sogn og Fjordane county council.

Her daughter became a local Centre Party politician too.

References

1932 births
2021 deaths
People from Flora, Norway
Centre Party (Norway) politicians
Sogn og Fjordane politicians
Deputy members of the Storting
Norwegian women in politics
Women members of the Storting